NuTone is an American company that manufactures products mainly for residential use, including doorbells, intercom systems, indoor air quality products, ventilation systems, range hoods, ceiling fans, built-in electric heaters, ironing equipment, and home theater systems.

The company was founded in 1936 by J. Ralph Corbett in Cincinnati, Ohio. Corbett backed an inventor from Dayton, Ohio who was marketing a doorbell that could replace door buzzers. The inventor defaulted on Corbett's loan, and Corbett marketed the product under the NuTone brand, reducing production costs enough to make doorbells affordable and creating the doorbell market. NuTone became a publicly traded company in 1955. Other NuTone-created products included the residential kitchen ventilator hood and built-in kitchen countertop appliances. In 1967, when the Corbetts sold their interest in the company to the Scovill Manufacturing Company,  NuTone was the largest American producer of home electrical products. The British home products manufacturer Valor purchased it in 1987 for $460 million. Nortek, Inc. acquired it from Williams plc in 1998 for $242.5 million, adding it to the Broan Group.

References

External links

Broan-NuTone

Home appliance manufacturers of the United States
Manufacturing companies based in Ohio
Companies based in Cincinnati
Electronics companies established in 1936
Manufacturing companies established in 1936